Fonte da Saudade is a region in the South Zone of Rio de Janeiro, which is not officially recognized as a neighbourhood.  It is located in the neighborhood of Lagoa.

References

Geography of Rio de Janeiro (city)